is a junior college in Chōfu, Tokyo, Japan. It was established in 1955.

Academic departments
 Music

External links
  

Educational institutions established in 1955
Japanese junior colleges
1955 establishments in Japan
Universities and colleges in Tokyo